Nalini Ranjan Sarkar (1882–25 January 1953) was an Indian businessman, industrialist, economist, and public leader. He was greatly involved in the political and economic regeneration of Bengal. Sarkar was Finance Minister of West Bengal in 1948. The Sarkar Committee Report was instrumental in the subsequent establishment of the four Indian Institutes of Technology (IITs) by the Government of India.

Early life, education and joining politics
Nalini Ranjan Sarkar was born in a middle class Kayastha family from Kendua of greater Mymensingh district (now Netrokona District, Bangladesh), British India. After passing the Entrance Examination from the Pogose School, Dhaka in 1902, he joined the Jagannath College in Dhaka. Subsequently, he joined the City College, Calcutta, of the University of Calcutta but could not continue his studies for financial reasons. He came to Kolkata penniless. He plunged into nationalist movement which swept over the country in the wake of Partition of Bengal in 1905. He enlisted himself as a Congress volunteer, lived in a dingy mess room huddled together with his friends. Often he had to pass days without food; for morning tea and snacks he would go to houses of his friends and patrons. Courage and fortitude sustained him. He soon came to the notice of Deshbandhu Chittaranjan Das who arranged for him a petty job in Hindustan Cooperative Insurance of which poet Rabindranath Tagore was the Founder Chairman and Surendranath Tagore the chief executive.

Career
Sarker had close contacts with Surendranath Banerjee, Tej Bahadur Sapru, Motilal Nehru, Mahatma Gandhi, Rabindranath Tagore and Chittaranjan Das, all of whom developed his ideas of nationalism and economic freedom. He joined the movement against the partition of Bengal in 1905. In later years, influenced by Gandhi's ideas of non-violence, he participated in the Non-Cooperation Movement in 1920.

In the early 1920s, when C. R. Das and Motilal Nehru founded the Swarajya Party, he joined it and soon became one of its leaders. He was, at the same time, involved with the Bengal Provincial Congress Committee. He was also a member of the Bengal Legislative Council from 1923 to 1930 and again from 1937 to 1946 as well as Chief Whip of the parliamentary Swarajya Party in Bengal. In the Calcutta session of the Indian National Congress in 1928, he acted as the Secretary of the Exhibition organised for the occasion. He was one of the key figures of the Indian National Congress party in Bengal. He, Bidhan Chandra Roy, Nirmal Chandra Chunder, Sarat Chandra Bose, and Tulsi Chandra Goswami constituted what was known as the "Big Five" of the Bengal Congress. He was elected a councillor of the Calcutta Municipal Corporation in 1932 and became its mayor by 1934. His cousin Dhirendra Nath Sarker was also involved in his activities.

From 1935 to 1953
In 1936, he organised the Krishak Praja Party with A. K. Fazlul Huq, and in 1937, joined the first Huq ministry as the Finance Minister. In 1938, he resigned, but later joined the reconstituted ministry. In 1939, he resigned again, expressing his disappointment with the change in the outlook of the cabinet. He joined the Viceroy's Executive Council (1941–42) first as Member in charge of Education, Health and Lands and then as the person in charge of Commerce, Industry and Food. In 1943, he resigned protesting the detention of Gandhi. He was Finance Minister of West Bengal in 1948 and retired from politics in 1952 after officiating as Chief Minister of West Bengal for a few months in 1949.  Post the independence of India, Sarkar chaired a 3-man expert committee to draft the financial sections of the Indian constitution.

Non-political life
In 1911, he entered the Hindusthan Cooperative Insurance Society and from a humble position rose to the high position of its general manager and ultimately became its president, a position he held till his death. At his instance, Hindustan Cooperative Insurance Society invested large amount in acquiring vast area of land in South-West of Kolkata for the purpose of setting up a modern satellite township for residential purpose. This area is today known as New Alipore.

He was also the President of both the Federation of Indian Chambers of Commerce & Industry (FICCI) in 1933 & the Bengal National Chamber of Commerce & Industry and member of Consultation Committee for revision of Company Law, Central Banking Enquiry Committee, Board of Income Tax Referees, Railway Retrenchment Committee, Separation Council and Board of Economic Enquiry, Research Utilisation Committee and Central Jute Committee. He was a delegate to the Indo-Japanese Trade Conference in 1923. He was also a Commissioner of the Calcutta port and a trustee of the Chittaranjan Seva Sadan.

He also acted as the vice-president of National Council of Education, Bengal, and contributed to the spread of education in India. He was made a Fellow of the Calcutta University Senate in 1934, a Member of the Court of the University of Dacca in 1940–41 and the President of Presidency College Governing Body in 1942. He was the Pro-Chancellor of Delhi University during the period 1941–42 as well as Banaras Hindu University. He also served as the Chairman of the All India Council for Technical Education during 1946 – 1952. It was the Nalini Ranjan Sarkar committee that recommended the set up of IIT's, along the lines of the Massachusetts Institute of Technology (MIT)

He died on 25 January 1953 of a heart attack at his home in Kolkata (then Calcutta), at the age of 70

References

Indian independence activists from West Bengal
1953 deaths
University of Calcutta alumni
1882 births
Businesspeople from Kolkata
City College, Kolkata alumni
West Bengal politicians
State cabinet ministers of West Bengal
Mayors of Kolkata
Indian businesspeople in insurance
Members of the Council of the Governor General of India